Clairmont is a ghost town located 19 miles northeast of Glenwood in Catron County, New Mexico, United States.

History
As early as 1822 the site is reported to have been a mining camp, surviving through the 1880s as a supply center for prospectors. Located near Copper Creek, today there are old log cabins and a corral on the site. In 1883 the town had a post office. Clairmont is noted by historians as having been a significant mining community.

References

External links
 Photo of cabin at Clairmont

Ghost towns in Catron County, New Mexico
Populated places established in 1822
1822 establishments in New Mexico Territory